Ejner Bainkamp Johansson (7 March 1922 – 28 September 2001) was a Danish art historian, magister of art, writer, and documentary film director. He is also a 1998 N. L. Høyen Medal recipient.

Early life 

Ejner Bainkamp Johansson was born in 1922 in Copenhagen. He was the son of a Swedish immigrant (who became a naturalised Danish citizen in 1927), Axel Robert Johansson, (b. 14. June 1897 – 25 January 1968; Copenhagen) from Furuby, Småland, and a Danish mother, Margrethe Hansine Hansen (b. 22 April 1880 – 26 January 1952 in Copenhagen), from Skibby.

Career 
Johansson got his magister of art in 1956 on art history. In 1967 he was employed as a television producer in Denmark's Radio with the arts as his specialty. Here he hosted a number of late night programs on art and culture.

Johansson also assisted the Hirschsprung Collection with several exhibits.

Personal life 
Johansson had a son named Karsten Johansson (b. 1943) and through him was the paternal grandfather of actresses Scarlett and Vanessa Johansson and Hunter, Adrian and Christian Johansson. According to Scarlett, she knows almost nothing about her grandfather. Even though she visited Denmark, she actually never met him due to his estrangement from her father.

Works 
Johansson wrote a large number of cultural and art historical books. Some of them are:
 Dansk marinemaleri i det nittende aarhundrede (1951)
 Richard Mortensen (1962) (translated into English and French)
 Omkring Frederiksholms Kanal (1964)
 Andersens ansigter (1992)
 De danske malere i München (1997)

Awards 
Johanson received LO's Culture Prize in 1984. He  received the N. L. Høyen Medal in 1998.

References

External links 
 Udgivelser of Ejner Johansson in bibliotek.dk
 Ejner Johansson Obituary 

1922 births
2001 deaths
20th-century Danish non-fiction writers
Danish art historians
Danish male screenwriters
People from Copenhagen
Danish people of Swedish descent
20th-century screenwriters
20th-century non-fiction writers